3691 Bede , provisional designation , is an Amor asteroid discovered on March 29, 1982, by Luis E. González at Cerro El Roble.

Based on lightcurve studies, Bede has a rotation period of 226.8 hours, but this figure is based on less than full coverage, so that the period may be wrong by 30 percent or so.

References

External links 
 
 
 

003691
Named minor planets
003691
003691
19820329